Network theory is an area of applied mathematics.

This page is a list of network theory topics.

Network theorems

Max flow min cut theorem
Menger's theorem
Metcalfe's law

Network properties

Centrality
Betweenness centrality
Closeness

Network theory applications
Bose-Einstein condensation: a network theory approach

Networks with certain properties

Complex network
Scale-free network
Small-world network
Small world phenomenon

Other terms

Bottleneck (network)
Blockmodeling
Network automaton
Network effect
Network flow
Pathfinder network
Scalability
Sorting network
Space syntax
Spanning tree protocol
Strategyproof
Structural cohesion
Vickrey–Clarke–Groves
Tree and hypertree networks

Examples of networks
Bayesian network
Bridges of Königsberg
Computer network
Ecological network
Electrical network
Gene regulatory network
Global shipping network 
Neural network
Project network
Petri net
Semantic network
Social network
Spin network
Telecommunications network
Value network
Workflow
Metabolic network
Metabolic network modelling

 
Outlines of mathematics and logic
Wikipedia outlines
Lists of topics